Salmon House may refer to:

Houses
W. S. Salmon House, is a house in southeast Portland, Oregon, United States, listed on the National Register of Historic Places.
George Salmon House, South Carolina, United States
Salmon Washburn House, an historic house in Taunton, Massachusetts, United States
Salmon-Stohlman House, an historic home in Somerset, Maryland, United States

Places
Salmon House Falls, at the confluence of the Dean and Takia Rivers in British Columbia, Canada. The location is referred to also as Salmon House

See also
Salmon (disambiguation)